Gerald Young may refer to:

 Gerald Young (baseball) (born 1964), former baseball outfielder
 Gerald O. Young (1930–1990), United States Air Force officer and Medal of Honor recipient
 Gerry Young (born 1936), English former footballer
 Gerald L. Young, ecologist
 Gerald R. Young, American intelligence official